The Dehaene–Changeux model (DCM), also known as the global neuronal workspace or the global cognitive workspace model is a part of Bernard Baars's "global workspace model" for consciousness.

It is a computer model of the neural correlates of consciousness programmed as a neural network. It attempts to reproduce the swarm behaviour  of the brain's higher cognitive functions such as consciousness, decision-making and the central executive functions. It was developed by cognitive neuroscientists Stanislas Dehaene and Jean-Pierre Changeux beginning in 1986. It has been used to provide a predictive framework to the study of inattentional blindness and the solving of the Tower of London test.

History
The Dehaene–Changeux model was initially established as a spin glass neural network attempting to represent learning and to then provide a stepping stone towards artificial learning among other objectives. It would later be used to predict observable reaction times within the priming paradigm and in inattentional blindness.

Structure

General structure
The Dehaene–Changeux model is a meta neural network (i.e. a network of neural networks) composed of a very large number of integrate-and-fire neurons programmed in either a stochastic or deterministic way. The neurons are organised in complex thalamo-cortical columns with long-range connexions and a critical role  played by the interaction between von Economo's areas. Each thalamo-cortical column is composed of pyramidal cells and inhibitory interneurons receiving a long-distance excitatory neuromodulation which could represent noradrenergic input.

A swarm and a multi-agent system composed of neural networks

Among others Cohen & Hudson (2002) had already used "Meta neural networks as intelligent agents for diagnosis " Similarly to Cohen & Hudson, Dehaene & Changeux have established their model as an interaction of meta-neural networks (thalamocortical columns) themselves programmed in the manner of a "hierarchy of neural networks that together act as an intelligent agent", in order to use them as a system composed of a large scale of inter-connected intelligent agents for predicting the self-organized behaviour of the neural correlates of consciousness. It may also be noted that Jain et al. (2002) had already clearly identified spiking neurons as intelligent agents since the lower bound for computational power of networks of spiking neurons is the capacity to simulate in real-time for boolean-valued inputs any Turing machine. The DCM being composed of a very large number of interacting sub-networks which are themselves intelligent agents, it is formally a Multi-agent system programmed as a Swarm or neural networks and a fortiori of spiking neurons.

Behavior
The DCM exhibits several surcritical  emergent behaviors such as multistability and a Hopf bifurcation between two very different regimes which may represent either sleep or arousal with a various all-or-none behaviors which Dehaene et al. use to determine a testable taxonomy between different states of consciousness.

Scholarly reception

Self-organized criticality
The Dehaene-Changeux Model contributed to the study of nonlinearity and self-organized criticality in particular as an explanatory model of the brain's emergent behaviors, including consciousness. Studying the brain's phase-locking and large-scale synchronization, Kitzbichler et al. (2011a) confirmed that criticality is a property of human brain functional network organization at all frequency intervals in the brain's physiological bandwidth.

Furthermore, exploring the neural dynamics of cognitive efforts after, inter alia, the Dehaene-Changeux Model, Kitzbichler et al. (2011b) demonstrated how cognitive effort breaks the modularity of mind to make human brain functional networks transiently adopt a more efficient but less economical configuration. Werner (2007a) used the Dehaene-Changeux Global Neuronal Workspace to defend the use of statistical physics approaches for exploring phase transitions, scaling and universality properties of the so-called "Dynamic Core" of the brain, with relevance to the macroscopic electrical activity in EEG and EMG. Furthermore, building from the Dehaene-Changeux Model, Werner (2007b) proposed that the application of the twin concepts of scaling and universality of the theory of non-equilibrium phase transitions can serve as an informative approach for elucidating the nature of underlying neural-mechanisms, with emphasis on the dynamics of recursively reentrant activity flow in intracortical and cortico-subcortical neuronal loops. Friston (2000) also claimed that "the nonlinear nature of asynchronous coupling enables the rich, context-sensitive interactions that characterize real brain dynamics, suggesting that it plays a role in functional integration that may be as important as synchronous interactions".

States of consciousness and phenomenology
It contributed to the study of phase transition in the brain under sedation, and notably GABA-ergic sedation such as that induced by propofol (Murphy et al. 2011, Stamatakis et al. 2010). The Dehaene-Changeux Model was contrasted and cited in the study of collective consciousness and its pathologies (Wallace et al. 2007). Boly et al. (2007) used the model for a reverse somatotopic study, demonstrating a correlation between baseline brain activity and somatosensory perception in humans. Boly et al. (2008) also used the DCM in a study of the baseline state of consciousness of the human brain's default network.

Publications
 Naccache, L. Cognitive aging considered from the point of view of cognitive neurosciences of consciousness. Psychologie & NeuroPsychiatrie du vieillissement. Volume 5, Number 1, 17–21, Mars 2007
 Rialle, V and Stip, E. Cognitive modeling in psychiatry: from symbolic models to parallel and distributed models J Psychiatry Neurosci. 1994 May; 19(3): 178–192.
 Ravi Prakash, Om Prakash, Shashi Prakash, Priyadarshi Abhishek, and Sachin Gandotra Global workspace model of consciousness and its electromagnetic correlates Ann Indian Acad Neurol. 2008 Jul–Sep; 11(3): 146–153. 
 Zigmond, Michael J.(1999) Fundamental neuroscience''', Academic Press p1551
 Bernard J. Baars, Nicole M. Gage Cognition, brain, and consciousness: introduction to cognitive neuroscience Academic Press, 2010 p. 287
 Carlos Hernández, Ricardo Sanz, Jaime Gómez-Ramirez, Leslie S. Smith, Amir Hussain, Antonio Chella, Igor AleksanderFrom Brains to Systems: Brain-Inspired Cognitive Systems' Volume 718 of Advances in Experimental Medicine and Biology Series Springer, 2011 p. 230
 Steven Laureys et al. The boundaries of consciousness: neurobiology and neuropathology Volume 150 of Progress in Brain Research Elsevier, 2006 p. 45
 Michael S. Gazzaniga The cognitive neurosciences MIT Press, 2004 p.1146
 Stanislas Dehaene The cognitive neuroscience of consciousness MIT Press 2001 p.13
 Tim Bayne, Axel Cleeremans, Patrick Wilken The Oxford companion to consciousness Oxford University Press 2009 p.332
 Hans Liljenström, Peter Århem Consciousness transitions: phylogenetic, ontogenetic, and physiological aspects'' Elsevier 2008 p. 126

See also

Artificial consciousness
Complex system
Neuroscience

References

External links
 "Selected publications of Stanislas Dehaene". INSERM-CEA Cognitive Neuroimaging Unit.

Consciousness studies
Cognition
Cognitive architecture
Cognitive modeling
Artificial neural networks
Machine learning algorithms
Systems articles needing attention
Computational neuroscience
Cognitive neuroscience